John Dixon is a Trials Division judge at the Supreme Court of Victoria. Before being appointed to the court he practiced as a lawyer for 33 years, since 1977. He is a graduate of the law school at the University of Queensland and completed his Masters of Laws at University of Melbourne.

References

Judges of the Supreme Court of Victoria
University of Queensland alumni
Living people
Year of birth missing (living people)